Burnhamthorpe Collegiate Institute and Adult Learning Centre (Burnhamthorpe CI, BCI, Burnhamthorpe ALC, BCALC, or Burnhamthorpe) is an adult and alternative high school in Toronto, Ontario, Canada. It is located in the Eatonville neighbourhood of the former suburb of Etobicoke. It has operated since 1956, currently by the Toronto District School Board, originally part of the Etobicoke Board of Education. It offers credit courses to adult learners (21 and over) and to young adults (18-20). The motto for Burnhamthorpe is Quisque Praestet Officium which translates to "No matter whose attention offers".

History
The school was constructed in 1955 and opened on September 4, 1956 to students. The original street address was 76 Keane Avenue. The building was designed by architects Shore and Moffat. Burnhamthorpe was officially opened on November 9, 1956.

During the 1966 school year BCI shared classrooms with students at Martingrove Collegiate Institute, whose school was not completed in time for the start of the school year.

Notable alumni
Robin Duke - actress, Second City Television and Saturday Night Live
Catherine O'Hara - actress and writer, Second City Television
Linda Manzer - luthier (guitar maker)
Nik Ranieri - Supervising Animator, Walt Disney Feature Animation
Steve Sklepowich - Former Microsoft executive, now CMO at XSENSOR Technology.
George Smitherman - former Ontario Deputy Premier

See also

List of high schools in Ontario

References

External links
Burnhamthorpe Collegiate Institute
TDSB Profile (EdVance)
TDSB Profile (Adult)

High schools in Toronto
Education in Etobicoke
Educational institutions established in 1956
Schools in the TDSB
1956 establishments in Ontario
Alternative education
Adult education